Eldorado is a 2018 Swiss documentary film directed by Markus Imhoof. It was selected as the Swiss entry for the Best Foreign Language Film at the 91st Academy Awards, but was not nominated.

Synopsis
Director Markus Imhoof examines the European migrant crisis and contrasts it against his boyhood experience with a post-World War II Italian refugee.

See also
 List of submissions to the 91st Academy Awards for Best Foreign Language Film
 List of Swiss submissions for the Academy Award for Best Foreign Language Film

References

External links
 

2018 films
2018 documentary films
Swiss documentary films
2010s German-language films
Films directed by Markus Imhoof
Swiss German-language films